"Prisoner of the Highway" is a song written by Mike Reid, and recorded by American country music singer Ronnie Milsap.  It was released in September 1984 as the second single from the album One More Try for Love.  The song was later included on one of his compilation albums that was released in 1992; this album was entitled Greatest Hits Vol. 3.

Content
The song tells the story of a truck driver who is enticed, but also "imprisoned", by the highway. Yet he somehow finds freedom behind the wheel. It is rumored that a music video to the song was in post production earlier that year, but was later cancelled, although a video was filmed for the single's b-side "She Loves My Car".

Success and reception
The song was a major Top 10 hit on the Billboard magazine Hot Country Songs charts, peaking at No. 6. Although it didn't top the charts like many of Milsap's songs, it was very popular as it received heavy airplay on several major country stations. It is still played at many of his concerts today, and receives occasional airplay on the radio.

Mark Wills recorded a cover of the song, as a duet with Milsap, on Wills's 2003 album And the Crowd Goes Wild.

Aaron Tippin recorded a cover version of the song on his 2009 truck-driving themed album "In Overdrive".

Chart positions

References

1984 singles
Ronnie Milsap songs
Mark Wills songs
Aaron Tippin songs
Songs written by Mike Reid (singer)
RCA Records singles
1984 songs
Songs about truck driving